Mgboko is a town home to the Local Government Headquarters of Obi Ngwa, Abia State, Nigeria.

Towns in Abia State